The men's 50 m manikin carry event in lifesaving at the 2017 World Games took place on 22 July 2017 at the Orbita Indoor Swimming Pool in Wrocław, Poland.

Competition format
A total of 20 athletes entered the competition. Athletes with the best 8 times in heats qualifies to the final.

Results

Heats

Final

References 

Lifesaving at the 2017 World Games
2017 World Games